Maulana Muhammad Jamal ud Din (born 1 January 1961) is a Pakistani politician who has been a member of the National Assembly of Pakistan, since August 2018. Previously he was a member of the National Assembly from June 2013 to May 2018.

Early life

He was born on 1 January 1961.

Political career

He was elected to the National Assembly of Pakistan as a candidate of Jamiat Ulema-e-Islam (F) from Constituency NA-42 (Tribal Area-VII) in 2013 Pakistani general election. He received 3,468 votes and defeated an independent candidate, Qayyum Sher Mahsud.

He was re-elected to the National Assembly as a candidate of Muttahida Majlis-e-Amal (MMA) from Constituency NA-49 (Tribal Area-X) in 2018 Pakistani general election. He received 7,794 votes and defeated Dost Muhammad Khan, a candidate of Pakistan Tehreek-e-Insaf.

References

Living people
Muttahida Majlis-e-Amal MNAs
Pakistani MNAs 2013–2018
People from Khyber Pakhtunkhwa
1961 births
Jamiat Ulema-e-Islam (F) politicians
Pakistani MNAs 2018–2023